Lonesome's Pizza was a pizzeria in Portland, Oregon. Co-owners Noah Antieu and Nik Sin started the delivery-only business in 2010. In 2012, Lonesome's began operating from a window at the nightclub and music venue Dante's. Known for its quirky pizza names and for including artwork and music with deliveries, the pizzeria closed in 2017.

Description

Lonesome's Pizza was a pizzeria operating from a window of the nightclub and music venue Dante's on West Burnside Street in downtown Portland. The business used creative names for pies, such as the Dolph Lundgren vs. a Puma, and included "indie" artwork and music with deliveries. Willamette Week Matthew Korfhage described the restaurant as a "late-night delivery pizza spot ... made famous for including edible glitter among its toppings and art in every box".  The menu included classic, meat, vegan, and vegetarian pizzas. The Vingt Deux had tomato sauce with Ethiopian spices, braised leg of lamb, and crumbled goat cheese. The vegan Treize had Daiya cheese, seitan sausage, cherry tomatoes, scallions, and basil. Lonesome's Pizza was open as late as 4 am.

History
Co-owners Noah Antieu and Nik Sin opened Lonesome's Pizza on West Burnside Street in mid 2010. Initially, the business only delivered pizzas, operating until 4 am from Wednesday to Sunday. The menu had "constantly-rotating" pizza names, such as a four-cheese pie called "Jacques Cousteau vs. that stingray that killed the crocodile guy". In November 2011, the pizzeria partnered with the Northwest Film Center to deliver DVDs showcasing winning shorts from the organization's film festival.

Lonesome's Pizza relocated to Dante's in September 2012. The move allowed the business to sell pizza by the slice, expand hours, and deliver to the city's west side. The pizzeria began offering four varieties of pizza by the slice at the window. After relocating to Dante's, Lonesome's offered delivery from 11 am to 3 am (4 am on weekends), with the window open until 2:30 am. The pizza window closed in early July 2017 and was replaced by Pizza Slut. Lonesome's Pizza's website was updated with information for donating to Planned Parenthood. Two weeks after Lonesome's Pizza closed, the Travel Channel published a positive review of the restaurant.

The "ever-changing" Lonesome's Pizza mural on the exterior of Dante's depicted Antieu and Sin, as of 2017. After the business announced plans to close, someone crossed out Antieu's face and added a heart and arrow pointing to Sin. Then, the image of Antieu was removed altogether. Frank Faillace, owner of Dante's, said: "The mural was their signage and since they are no longer in business the wall was returned to its previous state. There was some graffiti on the wall before it was painted over, but we have no information on it unfortunately, as our security cameras did not cover that area at the time it happened."

Reception
Matthew Korfhage of Willamette Week described Lonesome's Pizza as "famously quirky". After the business closed, he said, "we will forever miss their Fela Kuti mix CDs and their crouching tiger hidden whatever, their 'Hammy's Pizza vs. a wet paper bag with a mustache,' and their vingt-six by any name. In an age of Postmates, delivery pizza just got a little bit worse." The Travel Channel included Lonesome's Pizza in a list of 5 pizza establishments "worth checking out" in Portland. Eater Portland Mattie John Bamman described the pizzeria as "a true indie-style Portland classic" and said the business was "obsessively adored".

See also
 List of defunct restaurants of the United States
 Pizza in Portland, Oregon

References

External links

 Lonesome's Pizza at Zomato

2010 establishments in Oregon
2017 disestablishments in Oregon
Defunct Italian restaurants in Portland, Oregon
Defunct pizzerias
Pizzerias in Portland, Oregon
Restaurants disestablished in 2017
Restaurants established in 2010
Southwest Portland, Oregon